Ocean Man 69D is an Indian reserve of the Ocean Man First Nation in Saskatchewan. In the 2016 Canadian Census, it recorded a population of 5 living in 2 of its 2 total private dwellings.

References

Indian reserves in Saskatchewan
Division No. 1, Saskatchewan
Ocean Man First Nation